Richard Lambert (born April 28, 1948) is a Canadian former handball player who competed in the 1976 Summer Olympics.

Born in  Edmonton, Alberta, Lambert was part of the Canadian handball team which finished eleventh in the 1976 Olympic tournament. He played four matches and scored four goals.

References
 profile

1948 births
Living people
Canadian male handball players
Olympic handball players of Canada
Handball players at the 1976 Summer Olympics
Sportspeople from Edmonton